The Fig Tree Formation, also called Fig Tree Group, is a stromatolite-containing geological formation in South Africa. The rock contains fossils of microscopic life forms of about 3.26 billion years old. Identified organisms include the bacterium Eobacterium isolatus and the algae-like Archaeosphaeroides barbertonensis. The fossils in the Fig Tree Formation are considered some of the oldest known organisms on Earth, and provide evidence that life may have existed much earlier than previously thought. The formation is composed of shales, turbiditic greywackes, volcaniclastic sandstones, chert, turbiditic siltstone, conglomerate, breccias, mudstones, and iron-rich shales.

See also 
 Archean life in the Barberton Greenstone Belt
 Warrawoona Group

References

Further reading 
 
 Byerly G.R., Lower D.R. & Walsh M.M. (1986). Stromatolites from the 3300–3500-Myr Swaziland Supergroup, Barberton Mountain Land, South Africa. Nature, 319: 489–491.

Geologic formations of South Africa
Archean Africa
Sandstone formations
Shale formations
Conglomerate formations
Siltstone formations
Mudstone formations
Chert
Fossiliferous stratigraphic units of Africa
Paleontology in South Africa
Origin of life